Naked Imperialism: The U.S. Pursuit of Global Dominance is a book published in the year 2006 by John Bellamy Foster. In the book Foster explains that, since September 11, 2001, the United States has been involved in wars in Afghanistan and Iraq, increased the global reach of its military bases, and spent more money on the military. In his analysis, U.S. militarism and economic imperialism have deep political and economic roots in U.S. history and the logic of capitalism. The apparent objective of the imperialist system of today (as in the past) is to open up peripheral economies to investment from core capitalist countries, thus ensuring raw material supplies at low prices, and a net outflow of economic surplus from poorer countries to centre of the capitalist world.

References

2006 non-fiction books
Marxist works
American political books
Books about imperialism
Imperialism studies